Abdullah Azzan Al-Akbary (born 1 April 1966) is an Omani middle-distance runner. He competed in the men's 3000 metres steeplechase at the 1984 Summer Olympics.

References

External links
 

1966 births
Living people
Athletes (track and field) at the 1984 Summer Olympics
Omani male middle-distance runners
Omani male steeplechase runners
Olympic athletes of Oman
Place of birth missing (living people)